Cayuga is an unincorporated community and county seat of Haldimand County, Ontario, Canada located at the intersection of Highway 3 and Munsee Street and along the Grand River. Cayuga is about a 20-minute drive from Lake Erie and 30 minutes south of Hamilton and 115 minutes south of Toronto and consequently it has some cottages and recreational properties in the area.  In the past, there was some light industry.  It has the local district detachment for the Ontario Provincial Police. It is also uniquely located among larger communities on both the American and Canadian sides of the border boasting television reception from Toronto, Buffalo, New York, Hamilton, Kitchener and Erie, Pennsylvania.

History

Cayuga was incorporated as a village in 1859 and became the county seat for Haldimand County because of its central location.  It is named after the Cayuga, one of the Six Nations of the Grand River Natives who were awarded land in the area for siding with the British in the American Revolution. The locality' name in Mohawk language is Nikana'tsà:'a.

As the county seat, it is the location of the Court House, jail and a museum. In the late 18th century and early 19th century, public hangings were held in the courtyard and the prisoners buried on site. The Highway 3 bridge over the Grand River (Cayuga Bridge) was a very well recognized bridge over the Grand River and was commonly used as a symbol of Haldimand County and the Grand River. For example, the same bridge had been used in a movie that commemorated Terry Fox. That bridge no longer remains a symbol of the Grand River and Haldimand County as it was replaced in the summer of 2014 with a concrete bridge.

The village's population grew to about 2,500 in the mid-19th century because the Grand River was an important commercial route.  There were locks constructed at Indiana just north of Cayuga. However, when the Welland Canal was completed, the Grand became an obsolete route. Further, an impassable dam was built downriver from Cayuga at Dunnville. Although originally part of the Welland Canal, the purpose of the dam and a canal at Port Maitland is to keep the level of the Welland Canal consistent. Presently the population of Cayuga has recovered to approximately 1,500 after having been around 1,000 for almost a century.

In 1974, the village was amalgamated into the new town of Haldimand within the Regional Municipality of Haldimand-Norfolk. Despite nearby Caledonia being the largest community in the town, the town hall was located in Cayuga because of its central location. In 2001, Haldimand and all other municipalities within the region were dissolved and the region was instead divided into two single tier municipalities with city-status but called counties. Cayuga is now an unincorporated community in Ward 2 of Haldimand County.

Climate history

On February 13, 2009, the Grand River flooded when the river ice thawed, damaging Cayuga and Dunnville.
On February 14, 2009, the CCGC Griffin proceeded up the river to help clear ice.

Demographics
Cayugians are overwhelmingly British by national background but many can trace their roots to an original German settlement near Cayuga in the 19th century. There was also a large Dutch migration to the area after the Second World War.

Attractions

One of the most beautiful, and fully navigable portions of the Grand River, runs along the western portion of the town. People from all around the "Golden Horseshoe" take advantage of great fishing and recreational activities along this part of the Grand River. Cayuga features two boat ramps, a water gassing station and riverside restaurant, open during summer months.

In more recent years Cayuga has become known for auto racing.  The oldest continually operating dragstrip in Canada and the fastest high bank oval race track in Canada, are located near the townsite; Cayuga International Speedway. It is a 5/8-mile oval auto racing track, which was reopened in 2017 and hosts a round of the NASCAR Pinty's Series. The drag strip was originally a runway built for training British Commonwealth pilots during the Second World War.

Cayuga has a number of restaurants, including "River3", "The Cayuga Restaurant", "Twisted Lemon", and "The Back Forty (pub)". These restaurants cater to a variety of tastes and range in price and atmosphere from "very affordable" and family-oriented, to "moderately expensive" and urban-chic.

Cayuga has one grocery store, Cayuga Foodland, attached is a Pharmacy IDA. Cayuga also contains a Tim Hortons, a Pioneer gas station, LCBO (Liquor store), a Home Hardware & Ace Hardware, and a dental office. Haldimand Motors is one of Cayuga's biggest businesses.  Cayuga Mutual Insurance Company was founded in 1875 and its head office is located in Cayuga.

Just north of Cayuga is Ruthven Park (located in the old village of Indiana). This is a 1500-acre (6 km2) National Historic Site of Canada centered by the Thompson Mansion, which was the summer home of the Thompson family who owned the steamship lines on the Grand River when it was a commercial route.  It is a magnificent Greek Revival style mansion which is open for tours during the summer.

Cayuga Golf Club, is a public 18-hole golf course located 5 km west of Cayuga.

CayugaFest is an annual event in July which started in 2002 and provides a weekend full of fun for all ages. The mission of CayugaFest is to give back to the community in a fun and exciting way. Featuring: a parade, Kidz Zone, music stage, craft displays & sales, Soapbox Derby, Cayuga heritage displays, classic car show, and food vendors.

Sports

Just south of Cayuga and demographically associated is the hamlet of Fisherville. In 1954 a hockey team composed of local players which played out of the Cayuga Arena was sponsored by 'Fisherville Seed' and consequently known as the Fisherville Seedmen. It won the Ontario Intermediate Hockey Championship. Jack Melenbacher a local who was at the time an NHL referee mentored the team and a young Roy Edwards who played goal for the Seedmen later starred in the NHL for the Detroit Red Wings.

James Daly of Cayuga, is currently a national team athlete with Floorball Canada (2022). Last participating in the 2021 Floorball World Championships in Helsinki, Finland.

Government
Cayuga is in Ward 2 of Haldimand County. The current councillor for Ward 2 is Fred Morison 2010–Present. Before Fred Morison, it was Buck Sloat from 2003 to 2010.

The current Mayor Of Haldimand County is Ken Hewitt 2010–Present. The previous Mayor was Marie Trainer from 2003 to 2010. Before Marie Trainer, the mayor was Lorraine Bergstrand 2001–2003.

The current Clerk is Evelyn Eichenbaum who works in Cayuga at the Haldimand County Cayuga Administration building. The current Chief Administrative Officer of Haldimand County is Don Boyle who works in Cayuga at the Haldimand County Cayuga Administration building.

Landmarks

Cayuga is perched on the Banks of the Grand River, along a navigable portion of the river that stretches some 20 miles, ending at Lake Erie.

The main office of the Haldimand Press is located in Cayuga.

Cayuga has one of the oldest Courthouses in the area, located at 55 Munsee St. Until the late 1960s, a functioning jail surrounded by tall rock walls was attached to the Courthouse.

Previously the New York Central Railroad went through Cayuga but the track has been torn up.

One of the termini for the Underground Railway was St. Catharines, Ontario, which is about 45 minutes northeast of Cayuga. Harriet Tubman's nephew Lorne Barnes was the barber in Cayuga and was held out to the still-enslaved as an example of the success to be found by escaping to Canada.

There is a National bank and a credit union in town along with a United Church of Canada (Presbyterian, Methodist and Congregational), an Anglican Church and a Catholic Church.

The main street has a "rural brick charm" to it and many older houses continue to reflect Cayuga's prosperous past.  Cayuga very much retains its small-town character. Uniquely isolated for years by the Six Nations Indian Reservation to the North and the Lake to the South, it has its own independent atmosphere and does not feel attached to anyone larger community. Cayuga has had a small-town feel for decades, and the residents who have lived there for those decades appreciate the small-town charm.

Notable people
Frank Martin played over 300 games for the Chicago BlackHawks in the late 1940s and the early 1950s.

In 1939, Helen Kinnear, who had been previously appointed the first woman King's Counsel, was appointed the first woman Superior Court judge in the British Empire.

Dr. Justice T. David Marshall, Doctor of Medicine, Lawyer, Justice of the Supreme Court of the Northwest Territories, and Justice of the Superior Court of Ontario, honorary chief of Six Nations, Founding Director of Canada's National Judicial Institute. and Colonel Commandant of the Canadian Forces, Medical Branch. Author of several books including "Dr. Marshall's History of Haldimand County".

Cayuga is also known for producing a couple of noteworthy NHL hockey players. Both Marty McSorley and Ray Emery grew up playing minor league hockey in Cayuga.

Canadian filmmaker Jeremy LaLonde grew up in Cayuga attending Cayuga Secondary School where he was a prominent member of the drama club. He has since gone on to direct multiple feature films including How to Plan an Orgy in a Small Town, Sex After Kids, The Go-Getters, The Untitled Work of Paul Shepard, and James vs. His Future Self. He has also directed the TV series Baroness Von Sketch Show.

See also

 List of population centres in Ontario

References

External links
Ruthven Park: National Historic

Communities in Haldimand County
Populated places on the Underground Railroad
Populated places on the Grand River (Ontario)